The Oaks Academy (formerly King's Grove High School) is a mixed secondary school located on Buchan Grove in Crewe, Cheshire, England.

History

Grammar school
The site was the former Crewe Grammar School for Girls.

Comprehensive
It was previously a foundation school administered by Cheshire East Council, King's Grove High School.

Academy
The school converted to academy status in January 2016 and was renamed the Oaks Academy. However the school continues to coordinate with Cheshire East Council for admissions.

Notable former pupils

Crewe Grammar School for Girls
 Kali Mountford (née Newton), Labour MP from 1997 to 2010 for Colne Valley

References

External links
 

Secondary schools in the Borough of Cheshire East
Academies in the Borough of Cheshire East